The external occipital crest is part of the external surface of the squamous part of the occipital bone. It is a ridge along the midline, beginning at the external occipital protuberance and descending to the foramen magnum, that gives attachment to the nuchal ligament. It is also called the median nuchal line.

References

External links

Bones of the head and neck